Caligo idomeneus, the Idomeneus giant owl, is a butterfly of the family Nymphalidae. The species can be found in the Amazon rainforest and eastern Andes, from Venezuela to Ecuador, and south to the Mato Grosso in southern Brazil. The butterfly is named for Idomeneus, the leader of the Cretan army during the Trojan War.

The larvae feed on Musa species.

References

Caligo
Butterflies described in 1758
Taxa named by Carl Linnaeus
Fauna of Brazil
Nymphalidae of South America